The 2018 mid-year rugby union internationals (also known as the summer internationals in the Northern Hemisphere) are international rugby union matches that are mostly played in the Southern Hemisphere during the June international window.

The matches are part of World Rugby's global rugby calendar (2012–19) that includes test matches between touring Northern Hemisphere nations and home Southern Hemisphere nations. In addition, the global calendar gives Tier 2 nations the opportunity to play Tier 1 nations outside the November International Window, increasing competitiveness from the Tier 2 sides ahead of the 2019 Rugby World Cup.

Series

Fixtures

27 May

Notes:
 This is the first time since 2014 the Barbarians had defeated England.

31 May

2 June

Notes:
 Tomos Williams (Wales) and Robert du Preez, Thomas du Toit, André Esterhuizen, Travis Ismaiel, Jason Jenkins, Makazole Mapimpi, Ox Nché, Sikhumbuzo Notshe, Marvin Orie, Embrose Papier, Kwagga Smith, Akker van der Merwe and Ivan van Zyl (all South Africa) made their international debuts.
 This victory saw Wales record a record third consecutive win against the Springboks.

9 June

Notes:
 This is Japan's biggest winning margin over a Tier 1 Nation, surpassing the 15-point difference set in 1998 and 2013 with wins over Argentina and Wales.
 Giosuè Zilocchi (Italy) made his international debut.

Notes:
 Karl Tu’inukuafe (New Zealand) made his international debut.
 Beauden Barrett, Jordie Barrett and Scott Barrett became the first trio of brothers to start in an All Blacks XV.

Notes:
 Brandon Paenga-Amosa, Pete Samu and Caleb Timu (all Australia) made their international debuts.

Notes:
 Aphiwe Dyantyi, Sbu Nkosi and RG Snyman (all South Africa) and Brad Shields and Ben Spencer (both England) made their international debuts.
 Siya Kolisi became the first non-white South African captain.
 Mako Vunipola (England) earned his 50th test cap.

Notes:
 Javier Díaz, Bautista Delguy and Santiago Medrano (all Argentina) and Aaron Wainwright (Wales) made their international debuts.
 This is Wales' first victory over Argentina in Argentina since their 35–20 win in 2004.

Notes:
 Paul Mullen (United States) and Anton Drozdov (Russia) made their international debuts.
 The 49-point difference set surpasses the previous record set in 2004 when the United States won by 30 points (41–11)

Notes:
 Theo Sauder (Canada) and Lewis Carmichael, Adam Hastings, James Lang and Jamie Ritchie (all Scotland) made their international debuts.
 Nick Blevins and Phil Mack (both Canada) earned their 50th test cap.

16 June

Notes:
 Yu Tamura (Japan) earned his 50th test cap.
 Cherif Traorè (Italy) made his international debut.

Notes:
 Pierre Bougarit (France) made his international debut.
 New Zealand retain the Dave Gallaher Trophy.

Notes:
 Tadhg Beirne (Ireland) made his international debut.
 This was Ireland's first win in Australia since their 9–3 victory in Sydney in 1979.

Notes:
 Tendai Mtawarira (South Africa) earned his 100th test cap.

Notes:
 This win sees Wales claim their first series victory over Argentina since 1999.

Notes:
 Jorden Sandover-Best (Canada) made his international debut.
 This was Russia's first victory over Canada.

Notes:
 Matt Fagerson and George Horne (both Scotland) made their international debuts.
 This was the United States first win over Scotland, and their first against a Tier 1 nation since winning 17–3 against France in 1924.

23 June

Notes:
 Albert Tuisue (Fiji) made his international debut.
 Leone Nakarawa (Fiji) earned his 50th test cap.
 Vereniki Goneva's try was his 20th try which equaled Fiji's top try score set by Sanivalati Laulau back in 1985.
 This is the first time Tonga has beaten Fiji since their 32–20 loss in 2011.

Notes:
 Masakatsu Nishikawa (Japan) made his international debut.
 Viktor Kolelishvili (Georgia) earned his 50th test cap.
 This is Japan's biggest winning margin over Georgia, surpassing the 25-point difference set in 2006.

Notes:
 Shannon Frizell, Jack Goodhue, Jackson Hemopo and Richie Mo'unga (all New Zealand) and Félix Lambey (France) made their international debuts.
Maxime Médard (France) earned his 50th test cap.

Notes:
 Jack McGrath and Peter O'Mahony (both Ireland) earned their 50th test cap.
 Ireland claim their first series victory over Australia since 1979 and retain the Lansdowne Cup.

Notes:
 This was England's first victory over South Africa in South Africa since they won 27–22 in 2000.

Notes:
 Vili Toluta’u (United States) made his international debut.

Notes:
 Bautista Ezcurra and Juan Cruz Mallia (both Argentina) made their international debuts.
 Leonardo Senatore (Argentina) earned his 50th test cap.
 This was Scotland's largest winning margin over Argentina in Argentina.

See also
 2018 World Rugby Pacific Nations Cup
 2018 end-of-year rugby union internationals
 2019 RWC Qualifying – Cross-Regional play-offs

References

2019
2018–19 in European rugby union
2019 in Oceanian rugby union
2019 in South American rugby union
2019 in North American rugby union
2019 in South African rugby union